State Correctional Institution (SCI) Cambridge Springs  is a minimum-security correctional facility for females in Cambridge Springs, in Crawford County in northwestern Pennsylvania. The majority of the inmates housed here are nearing their release from prison.

Creation of SCI Cambridge Springs
 
In 1990, the Commonwealth of Pennsylvania purchased the former Polish National Alliance College campus and converted into a minimum-security women's institution. SCI Cambridge Springs opened in 1992, with the transfer of inmates from SCI Waynesburg.

Facility design
The existing buildings at SCI Cambridge Springs were built in the 1930s and 1940s; however, construction of new housing units and renovations have since been completed. There are 125 Acres at SCI Cambridge Springs, 40 of those being under the perimeter fence. There are 20 buildings that are operational at the facility, including five (5) out of six (6) housing units that contain both cells and dormitory-style living for inmates.

Capacity and demographics
At SCI Cambridge Springs, the inmate population, according to the June 2015  Monthly Inmate Capacity Report, presently there are 1,072 inmates being held there. This is 54 inmates over the capacity of 1,018 inmates, or a little bit over 105% capacity for the institution. The average age of an inmate at Cambridge Springs is 38 and the facility employs 311 full-time employees.

Inmate programs 
Inmate Supports at SCI Cambridge Springs include:

Education and training
 GED Training
 Vocational Education: Optical, Braille, Custodial Maintenance, Cosmetology

Inmate support groups
Family/Relationship Self
Sex Offenders
Alcohol and Other Drug (AOD)
Offense Related
Mental Health Programs

Prison and community development
Virtual Visitation
Correctional Industries: Optical Lab that makes glasses for all of the DOC facilities.  The Lab also services DEP Southeastern Region, DPW Norristown State Hospital, and other local nonprofit agencies.  The inmate must successfully complete a six-month vocational class before being permitted or eligible to work in the Optical Lab.  After completing the six-month vocational training, inmates have an opportunity to take the American Board of Opticianry test to become a certified Optician. This certification allows them to practice Opticianry in the United States.
Community Work Program - Inmates worked nearly 3,000 hours of CWP this year in the surrounding community.

Notable inmates
Notable inmates incarcerated at the facility include:
 Angela Marinucci – Convicted of the murder of Jennifer Daugherty

See also
 List of Pennsylvania state prisons

References

External links
 SCI Cambridge Springs, Pennsylvania Department of Corrections

Prisons in Pennsylvania
Buildings and structures in Crawford County, Pennsylvania
1992  establishments in Pennsylvania